The flag of the North Ossetian Autonomous Soviet Socialist Republic was adopted in 1954 by the government of the North Ossetian Autonomous Soviet Socialist Republic. The flag is identical to the flag of the Russian Soviet Federative Socialist Republic.

History

First version 
The first Constitution of the North Ossetian ASSR was approved on July 3, 1937 by the Extraordinary 7th Congress of Soviets of the North Ossetian ASSR. The flag of the North Ossetian ASSR was described in the Article 112 of the Constitution :

Revision 
On July 28, 1938, the bureau of the North Ossetian Regional Committee of the CPSU adopted a resolution on the introduction of the alphabet of the Ossetian script, starting on August 15, 1938, based on Cyrillic script. Accordingly, the inscriptions in the Ossetian language on the state flag of the North Ossetian ASSR were changed.

Second version 
On June 16, 1954, the 6th session of the Supreme Soviet of the North Ossetian ASSR adopted the Law of the North Ossetian ASSR "On the State Flag of the North Ossetian Autonomous Soviet Socialist Republic", which amended Article 112 of the Constitution of the North Ossetian ASSR:

On March 29, 1956, by the Decree of the Presidium of the Supreme Soviet of the North Ossetian ASSR, the Regulations on the State Flag of the North Ossetian ASSR was approved. By the Decree of the Supreme Soviet of the North Ossetian ASSR on December 28, 1967, the regulation was amended, on the days of raising the flag on state buildings and public institutions.

On May 30, 1978, the extraordinary 8th session of the Supreme Soviet of the North Ossetian ASSR of the 9th convocation adopted a new Constitution of the North Ossetian ASSR. The flag was described in Article 158 of the constitution :

Revision 
On June 24, 1981, by the Decree of the Presidium of the Supreme Council of the North Ossetian Autonomous Soviet Socialist Republic, the decree "On the State Flag of the North Ossetian Autonomous Soviet Socialist Republic" was introduced, and was approved by the law of the North Ossetian Autonomous Soviet Socialist Republic of December 16, 1981. The decree changed the inscriptions so that the inscriptions were positioned on the left side on the flag, to unify the design.

The decree also specifies the size of the letters, which is 1/16 of the flag's width, and both inscriptions has a distance of 1/25 of the width of the flag.

On September 10, 1981, the Council of Ministers of the North Ossetian ASSR approved the Instructions for the Application of the "Regulations on the State Flag of the North Ossetian ASSR".

Gallery

References

Citations

Bibliography 

North Ossetian Autonomous Soviet Socialist Republic